Jägersburg (in Dialect Järschborch or Jächersburch) is a district of Homburg in the Saar-Palatinate (Saarpfalz) district, Germany. Until End 1973 was Jägersburg an independent municipality in the former Homburg district.

Jägersburg has many lakes and ponds. The 3 lakes are the Möhlwoog (7,4 ha), the Brückweiher (7,09 ha) and the Schloßweiher (Castle lake) (1,71 ha).

Geography 
The districts Altbreitenfelderhof and Websweiler are parts of Jägersburg. As of 1 August 2021, the village Jägersburg has 2,704 inhabitants, Altbreitenfelderhof 115 and Websweiler 269.

Transport 
Jägersburg is served by the federal highway B 423.
Jägersburg has an old train station.

References

Homburg, Saarland